Barry Smith may refer to:

In sports
Barry Smith (footballer, born 1934) (1934–2007), English footballer (Bradford Park Avenue, Wrexham, Stockport)
Barry Smith (footballer, born 1953), English football goalkeeper (Colchester)
Barry Smith (footballer, born 1974), Scottish football player and manager (Dundee FC, Alloa Athletic)
Barry Smith (ice hockey, born 1955) (1955–2013), former NHL player for the Boston Bruins and the Colorado Rockies
Barry Smith (ice hockey, born 1952), American ice hockey coach
Barry Smith (American football) (born 1951), former NFL player for the Green Bay Packers
Barry Smith (runner) (born 1953), British long-distance runner
Barry Smith (motorcyclist) (born 1940), Australian motorcycle racer
Barry Smith (Australian footballer) (born 1939), Australian rules footballer for Footscray

Other
Barry Smith (ontologist) (born 1952), ontologist at the State University of New York at Buffalo
Barry Smith (preacher) (1933–2002), preacher from New Zealand
Barry Smith (organist) (born 1939), South African organist, orchestral and choral conductor
Barry C. Smith, senior lecturer in philosophy at Birkbeck College, University of London
Barry Smith, former member of the band Add N to (X)

See also
Barry Windsor-Smith (born 1949), comics artist
Barry Smyth (born 1973), Irish former head chef and restaurant owner
Jason Barry-Smith (born 1969), Australian operatic baritone and vocal coach